Sylvie is the first album by French singer Sylvie Vartan. It was released on an LP in 1962. The orchestration was by Eddie Vartan et Son Orchestre with Mickey Baker and His Orchestra backing on "Le Loco-motion" and "Comme l'été dernier".

Track listing

References

External links 
 Sylvie Vartan – Sylvie at Discogs

Sylvie Vartan albums
1962 debut albums
RCA Victor albums